Singha Bahadur Basnyat is a Nepalese soldier and former Commander-in-Chief of the Nepal Army. He was third son of Colonel Bhakta Bahadur Basnet. He attended a meeting at China alongside PM Nagendra Prasad Rijal and other high-ranking officials. He belonged to Khaptari Basnyat clan.

References

Sources 

1919 births
Possibly living people
Basnyat family
Nepalese generals
Nepalese military personnel